Alchemilla subcrenata is a species of flowering plant belonging to the family Rosaceae.

Its native range is Europe to Kamchatka.

References

subcrenata